Moritz von Beckerath (2 May 1838 in Krefeld –17 September 1896 in Munich) was a German painter from the Düsseldorf school of painting.

Works

Paintings
Wittekind calls the Saxons to fight (1873), Krefeld, Kaiser Wilhelm Museum
Alarich's burial in the Busento (around 1870), Munich, Schack-Galerie
Sleeping reveler (art trade)

Illustrations
In: Gustav Wendt : Ballad wreath: collected from German poets. Grote, Berlin 1866 ( urn : nbn: de: hbz: 061: 2-1665 Digitized edition of the University and State Library Düsseldorf ).
In: Düsseldorf picture portfolio: original drawings. Grote, Berlin 1866 ( urn : nbn: de: hbz: 061: 2-1138 Digitized edition of the University and State Library Düsseldorf).
Oh, if only it gave me the creeps and King Thrushbeard. In: German picture sheets for young and old. Gustav Weise, Stuttgart, around 1873.
From one who set out to learn to fear. In: Münchener Bilderbogen. Braun & Schneider, Munich (year unknown).

Literature
Julius Meyer, Hermann Lücke, Hugo von Tschudi (Hrsg.): General artist lexicon. Volume 3, Leipzig 1885, p. 272.
Friedrich von Boetticher: painter works of the 19th century. Contribution to art history. I-1, Dresden 1891, I-2, 1895.
Hyacinth Holland: Beckerath, Moriz von. In: Allgemeine Deutsche Biographie (ADB). Volume 46, Duncker & Humblot, Leipzig 1902, p. 327 f.
Hermann Board : Beckerath, Moritz von. In: Ulrich Thieme, Felix Becker (Hrsg.): General Lexicon of Fine Artists from Antiquity to the Present. Founded by Ulrich Thieme and Felix Becker. Tape 3: Bassano-Bickham. Wilhelm Engelmann, Leipzig 1909, p. 152 (Textarchiv - Internet Archive).
Hans Wolfgang Singer (Ed.): General artist lexicon. Life and works of the most famous visual artists. prepared by Hermann Alexander Müller. Literary Institute Rütten & Loening, Frankfurt am Main, Volume 1, Volume 5 (supplements) 1921.
Emmanuel Bénézit (ed.): Dictionnaire critique et documentaire des peintres, sculpteurs, dessinateurs et graveurs de tous les temps et de tous les pays. Volume 1, 1976.
Bruckmann's Lexicon of Munich Art. Munich painter in the 19th century. Volume 1, 1981.
Beckerath, Moritz von. In: General Artist Lexicon. The visual artists of all times and peoples (AKL). Volume 8, Saur, Munich and others. 1993, .
Wolfgang Hütt: The Düsseldorf School of Painting. 1819–1869. VEB EA Seemann Buch- und Kunstverlag, Leipzig 1984, pp. 240, 276.
Barbara Lülf, In: Hans Paffrath (Ed.): Lexicon of the Düsseldorf School of Painting 1819–1918. Volume 1: Abbema – Gurlitt. Published by the Kunstmuseum Düsseldorf in the Ehrenhof and by the Galerie Paffrath. Bruckmann, Munich 1997,  (fig.).

References

1838 births
1896 deaths
19th-century German painters
19th-century German male artists